Silver Line may refer to:

Public transit

Asia
 Silver Line (Delhi Metro), Delhi, India
 Silver Line (K-Rail), Kerala, India
 Silver Line (Manila), Manila, Philippines
 Silver Line (Wuhan), Wuhan, China
 Tokyo Metro Hibiya Line, color-coded "silver", Tokyo, Japan

Europe
 Silver Line (Madrid Metro), Madrid, Spain
 Silver Line (Moscow), Moscow, Russia

North America
 Silver Line (Dallas Area Rapid Transit), a commuter rail line in Texas
 Silver Line (Grand Rapids), Grand Rapids, Michigan
 Lynx Silver Line, a proposed transit extension in Charlotte, North Carolina
 Silver Line (MBTA), a system of bus lines in Boston, Massachusetts
 METRORapid Silver Line, Houston, Texas
 Silver Line (Mexico City), Mexico City
 Silver Line (San Diego Trolley), a heritage streetcar line operated by the San Diego Trolley
 Silver Line (Washington Metro), a rapid transit line of the Washington Metro system
 HealthLine, Cleveland, Ohio
 J Line (Los Angeles Metro), formerly the Silver Line, Los Angeles, California

South America
 Silver Line (Santiago Metro), Santiago, Chile
 Silver Line (São Paulo Metro), São Paulo, Brazil

Other uses
 Silver Line (shipping company), a British company
 Silver Line Boats, an American boat manufacturer
 The Silver Line, a helpline for older people in the UK
 Silverline, a Christian music band
 Silverline Helicopters, a Canadian operator

See also 
 Gray Line (disambiguation)
 White Line (disambiguation)
 Silver Lining (disambiguation)